The Kentucky Open is the Kentucky state open golf tournament, open to both amateur and professional golfers. It is organized by the Kentucky Golf Association. It has been played annually since 1920 at a variety of courses around the state.

Winners

2022 Patrick Newcomb
2021 J. B. Williams
2020 J. B. Williams
2019 J. B. Williams
2018 Trey Shirley
2017 Cooper Musselman (a)
2016 Ashton Van Horne
2015 Kent Bulle
2014 Rick Cochran III
2013 Rick Cochran III
2012 Keith Ohr
2011 Brandon Brown
2010 Andy Roberts (a)
2009 Matt Savage
2008 Trey Bowling (a)
2007 Phil Hendrickson (a)
2006 Matt Savage (a)
2005 Cale Barr (a)
2004 J. B. Holmes (a)
2003 J. B. Holmes (a)
2002 Grant Sturgeon
2001 Keith Ohr
2000 Buddy Harston
1999 Rob Bradley
1998 Stan Bickel
1997 Steve Smitha
1996 Chris Wilson (a)
1995 Chris Osborne
1994 Stan Bickel
1993 Steve Flesch
1992 Dave Peege
1991 Steve Flesch
1990 Dave Peege
1989 Rob McNamara (a)
1988 Ted Schulz
1987 Ralph Landrum
1986 Rob McNamara (a)
1985 Dave Peege (a)
1984 Ted Schulz
1983 Dave Peege (a)
1982 Steve Rogers (a)
1981 Phil Krick
1980 Jodie Mudd (a)
1979 Jodie Mudd (a)
1978 Jack Barber
1977 Jack Freeman
1976 Larry Gilbert
1975 Larry Gilbert
1974 Al Atkins
1973 Stacy Russell
1972 Brown Cullen
1971 Moe Demling
1970 Jimmy Ferriell
1969 Jimmy Ferriell
1968 Larry Gilbert
1967 Ron Acree
1966 Jimmy Ferriell
1965 Ted Hale
1964 Frank Beard
1963 Gordon Leishman
1962 Chick Yarbrough
1961 Chick Yarbrough
1960 Al Atkins
1959 Jack Ryan
1958 Jack Ryan
1957 Al Atkins
1956 Pete Doll
1955 Herman Coelho
1954 Courtney Noe
1953 Jack Ryan
1952 Jack Ryan
1951 Gay Brewer (a)
1950 Jack Ryan
1949 Jack Ryan
1948 Bus Schulz
1947 Jack Ryan
1946 Alvey Hume
1945 George Helm (a)
1944 Buck White
1943 Byron Nelson
1942 Jack Ryan
1941 Bud Beirne
1940 Jack Ryan
1939 Bill Kaiser
1938 Bill Kaiser
1937 Ray Ottman
1936 Jack Ryan
1935 Billy Wolfe (a)
1934 Bill Kaiser
1933 Jack Mohney (a)
1932 Ray Ottman
1931 Bernard Berning
1930 George Starks
1929 Ray Ottman
1928 Larry Wiechman
1927 Ben Wiechman
1926 Darwin Stapp (a)
1925 Craig Wood
1924 Leonard Loos
1923 Bob Peebles
1922 John Brophy
1921 Ernest Morris
1920 Bobby Craigs

(a) denotes amateur

External links
Kentucky Golf Association
List of winners

Golf in Kentucky
State Open golf tournaments